The "Songs of the Century" list is part of an education project by the Recording Industry Association of America (RIAA), the National Endowment for the Arts, and Scholastic Inc. that aims to "promote a better understanding of America's musical and cultural heritage" in American schools. Hundreds of voters, who included elected officials, people from the music industry and from the media, teachers, and students, were asked in 2001 by the NEA (National Endowment for the Arts) and the RIAA (Recording Industry Association of America) to choose the top 365 songs (not necessarily by Americans) of the 20th century with historical significance in mind. RIAA selected the voters, and about 15% (200) of the 1,300 selected voters responded.

The list
The list of the top 25 songs, in the order of votes received. Each song is followed by the name of the artist who made the most notable recording of the song.

References

Century